Glenmore is a Gaelic Athletic Association club situated in the south of County Kilkenny, Ireland. The club was founded in 1888 and has achieved hurling success at county, provincial and national level. Glenmore has also provided the Kilkenny intercounty team with several top players.

History
Glenmore first distinguished itself in Kilkenny on the football field, and it was only in the 1940s that hurling started to take over. Early success came in 1953, when the hurlers won the County Junior Championship. By the 1960s, Glenmore were among the top sides in the county, narrowly losing out to Bennettsbridge in the 1960 and 1964 county finals. Things soon took a turn for the worse, however, when the club was relegated to Junior status in 1967. They reached the final at that grade in 1968, but lost out to Johnstown. Glenmore finally broke back into the senior grade in 1980, winning the double of junior and Under 21 (Roinn A) championships.

Glenmore went from strength to strength in the 1980s, and finally reached their first Kilkenny Senior Hurling Championship final in 1987. They met Ballyhale Shamrocks in the final, and claimed the Tom Walsh Cup for the first time with a victory, 4-10 to 3-9. Glenmore were back in the final again in 1989, but Shamrocks got revenge for the 1987 defeat, despatching Glenmore with a score 2-11 to 1-13. A second county title came in 1990, when they got the better of Clara, champions from 1986, with a score 3-15 to 2-6. This gave the club a shot at the Leinster Senior Club Hurling Championship title, and they duly collected their medals after defeating Camross from Laois. Glenmore then secured a place in the All-Ireland Senior Club Hurling Championship final, and managed to win the biggest prize in the game after defeating Patrickswell from Limerick 1-13 to 0-12. Ray Heffernan captained the All-Ireland winning side, which featured such Glenmore legends as Eddie O'Connor, Eddie Aylward, Liam Walsh, Christy Heffernan, Willie O'Connor, Denis Mullally and Michael Phelan. 

Glenmore took their third county championship in 1992, seeing off Tullaroan 1-14 to 2-6. They added their fourth in 1995 with a 3-19 to 1-14 win against Fenians, and soon added a second Leinster medal to their collection. They did not book a date in the final, however, losing out to Ulster champions Dunloy from Antrim. Glenmore won their fifth and final county title in 1999, defeating Graigue-Ballycallan by 1-14 to 2-8.

Glenmore lost their senior status in 2005, losing out in a relegation play-off against Fenians.

In 2014, Glenmore lost their Intermediate Status losing in a relegation play off to Conahy Shamrocks by 2-22 to 3-16. This was a bitter blow for a famous club who not so long ago were a force to be reckoned with at the top table of Club Hurling both in Kilkenny and on the National Stage.

In 2016, Glenmore won another All Ireland title, this time in the Junior grade, edging out Eoghan Rua of Derry in the All Ireland final.

Honours
All-Ireland Senior Club Hurling Championships: 1
 1991
Leinster Senior Club Hurling Championships: 2
 1990, 1995
Kilkenny Senior Hurling Championships: 5
 1987, 1990, 1992, 1995, 1999
Kilkenny Intermediate Hurling Championships 1
 1982
 All-Ireland Junior Club Hurling Championship 1
 2016
Leinster Junior Club Hurling Championships 1
2015
Kilkenny Junior Hurling Championships 4
 1923, 1953, 1980, 1991, 2015
Kilkenny Under-21 Hurling Championships 3
 1980, 1982, 1988
Kilkenny Senior Football Championships: 20
 1906, 1915, 1916, 1920, 1922, 1923, 1924, 1929, 1938, 1939, 1940, 1942, 1943, 1949, 1950, 1954, 1955, 1989, 1998, 2009

External links
 Glenmore on the official Kilkenny website
 Information about Glenmore on the KilkennyCats website

References

Gaelic games clubs in County Kilkenny
Hurling clubs in County Kilkenny